Ornithoctonus is a genus of Southeast Asian tarantulas that was first described by Reginald Innes Pocock in 1892.  it contains three species, found in Thailand and Myanmar: O. andersoni, O. aureotibialis, and O. costalis.

See also
 List of Theraphosidae species

References

External links
 TarantulaCanada - pictures

Theraphosidae genera
Spiders of Asia
Taxa named by R. I. Pocock
Theraphosidae